The flag of Chechnya is a rectangle with sides in the ratio 2:3 representing the Chechen Republic, a republic of Russia. The flag is composed of three horizontal bars of, from top to bottom: green, representing Islam; white; and red; superimposed on them is a narrow vertical white band at the hoist, containing the national ornament, a design of four golden scroll shapes. The horizontal bars are in the proportions 4:1:3.

This flag, introduced in 2004, is primarily used by the government of Chechnya while the pro-independence flags are commonly used by opposition forces.

Historic flags
From 1957 to 1978, the Soviet flag of the Chechen-Ingush ASSR was based on the flag of the Russian SFSR with the addition of a blue vertical bar on the hoist side and the abbreviated name of the Republic (НГӀАССР in Chechen and Ingush, and ЧИАССР in Russian).

In 1978, these abbreviated names were replaced with the full versions: ЧЕЧЕНО-ИНГУШСКАЯ АССР in Russian, НОХЧ-ГӀАЛГӀАЙН АССР in Chechen, and НОХЧ-ГӀАЛГӀАЙ АССР in Ingush.

1991–2000
Several flags have been used by the supporters of the Chechen Republic of Ichkeria. The most common of these is the green flag with the red and white stripes. Its proportions are approximately 7:11. The color scheme is green, white, red, white, green, with the upper two-thirds of the flag in green and the remaining one third in white, red, white and green stripes of equal width, the width ratio of which is 8:1:1:1:1. Another well-known example is similar to this flag but has the country's coat of arms incorporated into the design. Each color is meant to symbolize an aspect of the Chechen national character. Green is the color of life, red symbolizes the bloodshed in the struggle for freedom and white represents the road to a bright future. These flags were mainly used by supporters of Dzhokhar Dudayev, Aslan Maskhadov and their successors. Apart from these several other designs have been used by different factions of the independentist movement, and even single sides used different flags at the same time.

Loyalist opposition

The pro-Moscow opposition to Dudayev used a flag of similar design with the main difference being the inversion of the red and white stripes and their different width-ratio. Its proportions are reported to be 7:11 and it consists of 5 horizontal stripes: green, red, white, red and green, the width ratio of which is 8:1:1:1:1. It has not been used since it was replaced by the current flag of the Chechen Republic.

See also
Coat of arms of the Chechen Republic

References

External links
 
 Flags of the World: Chechenia

Chechnya
Chechnya, Flag of
Chechnya
Chechnya